Matthieu Barthélémy (born 1982) is a French mountain bike orienteer. He won a bronze medal in the long distance at the 2009 World MTB Orienteering Championships in Ben Shemen.

References

External links
 

1982 births
French orienteers
Male orienteers
French male cyclists
Mountain bike orienteers
Living people
Place of birth missing (living people)
21st-century French people